The 2011 USTA Tennis Classic of Troy was a professional tennis tournament played on hard courts. It was the ninth edition of the tournament which is part of the 2011 ITF Women's Circuit. It took place in Troy, Alabama, United States between 10 and 16 October 2011.

WTA entrants

Seeds

 1 Rankings are as of October 3, 2011.

Other entrants
The following players received wildcards into the singles main draw:
  Ryann Foster
  Chieh-yu Hsu
  Melanie Oudin

The following players received entry from the qualifying draw:
  Elena Bovina
  Grace Min
  Marie-Ève Pelletier
  Shelby Rogers

The following players received entry by a lucky loser spot:
  Alexis King

Champions

Singles

 Romina Oprandi def.  Varvara Lepchenko, 6–1, 6–2

Doubles

 Elena Bovina /  Valeria Savinykh def.  Varvara Lepchenko /  Mashona Washington, 7–6(8–6), 6–3

External links
Official Website
ITF Search 

USTA Tennis Classic of Troy
Hard court tennis tournaments in the United States
USTA Tennis Classic